Great Salt Plains State Park is a  Oklahoma state park located in Alfalfa County, Oklahoma. Recreational opportunities at Great Salt Plains State Park include boating, camping, picnicking, swimming, hiking, mountain biking and exploring. The average depth is reportedly  and the impoundment capacity is 31,420 acre-feet. Salinity of the water in the reservoir is one-fourth that of sea water. Personal watercraft are not recommended. The park has RV and tent sites, comfort stations with showers, cabins, picnic sites, group shelters, swimming beach, playgrounds, boat ramps, fishing dock and equestrian trails. Horse rental is not available.

It was so named because it is covered with a layer of salt deposited long ago by an inland sea. A saline aquifer still flows beneath the surface and replenishes the salt whenever the water table rises. The salt is left behind when the water evaporates. The first white men to visit this area were members of the Sibley expedition in 1811, who named it the Grand Saline.

President Herbert Hoover designated an area of the Salt Fork east of Cherokee, Oklahoma as a National Wildlife Refuge on March 26, 1930. The Great Salt Plains National Wildlife Refuge sits adjacent to the park and offers great bird watching and fall foliage viewing opportunities.

The refuge is the only spot in the world where crystal enthusiasts can dig for hourglass selenite, a rare and fragile form of selenite, which is a form of gypsum. Digging times are available from April 1 through October 15.

Fees
To help fund a backlog of deferred maintenance and park improvements, the state implemented an entrance fee for this park and 21 others effective June 15, 2020.  The fees, charged per vehicle, start at $10 per day for a single-day or $8 for residents with an Oklahoma license plate or Oklahoma tribal plate.  Fees are waived for honorably discharged veterans and Oklahoma residents age 62 & older and their spouses.  Passes good for three days or a week are also available; annual passes good at all 22 state parks charging fees are offered at a cost of $75 for out-of-state visitors or $60 for Oklahoma residents.  The 22 parks are:
 Arrowhead Area at Lake Eufaula State Park
 Beavers Bend State Park
 Boiling Springs State Park
 Cherokee Landing State Park
 Fort Cobb State Park
 Foss State Park
 Honey Creek Area at Grand Lake State Park
 Great Plains State Park
 Great Salt Plains State Park
 Greenleaf State Park
 Keystone State Park
 Lake Eufaula State Park
 Lake Murray State Park
 Lake Texoma State Park
 Lake Thunderbird State Park
 Lake Wister State Park
 Natural Falls State Park
 Osage Hills State Park
 Robbers Cave State Park
 Sequoyah State Park
 Tenkiller State Park
 Twin Bridges Area at Grand Lake State Park

See also
Great Salt Plains
 Great Salt Plains State Park and National Wildlife Refuge

External links
US Army Corps of Engineers:Great Salt Plains Recreation

References

State parks of Oklahoma
Protected areas of Alfalfa County, Oklahoma
Geography of Oklahoma